Frank Dredge (9 February 1880 – 22 August 1916) was a New Zealand cricketer. He played in one first-class match for Wellington in 1905/06. 

Dredge was born in England, and moved to Australia before spending some years in Wellington, where he played senior club cricket. He returned to England in 1914 and joined the Wiltshire Regiment during World War I. He was killed in action during the Battle of the Somme.

See also
 List of Wellington representative cricketers
 List of cricketers who were killed during military service

References

External links
 

1880 births
1916 deaths
New Zealand cricketers
Wellington cricketers
Sportspeople from Salisbury
British military personnel killed in the Battle of the Somme
British Army personnel of World War I
Wiltshire Regiment soldiers
Military personnel from Wiltshire
British emigrants to Australia
Australian emigrants to New Zealand